Catherine D’lish is an American performance artist specializing in classical strip tease and burlesque.

Career
D'Lish uses elaborate costumes, and decorative props are part of her show. She has been the headlining performer at multiple events in the burlesque genre, including the 50th anniversary celebration of Playboy. Las Vegas shows were held at the Riviera, Stardust, Tropicana, Bally's, and Caesars Palace. Her acts include such elements of classic striptease as the bubble bath, the birdcage and the spider's web. Catherine has also appeared in a Nu-West Leda video, being whipped nude at night and on her breasts by Vanna, and strung up on Table Top Mountain by Ed Lee.

Awards
D'lish's titles include winner of Miss Exotic World in 1992 and 1994.

Personal life
Catherine D’lish has performed with Dita Von Teese and is also a friend of hers. She was one of the 60 guests to attend Dita's wedding to Marilyn Manson on December 3, 2005, in a non-denominational  ceremony in County Tipperary, Ireland.

References

External links

 Home page

Year of birth missing (living people)
American female erotic dancers
American erotic dancers
American neo-burlesque performers
Living people
Miss Exotic World winners
American beauty pageant winners
American vedettes
21st-century American women